Discrete Analysis is a mathematics journal covering the applications of analysis to discrete structures. Discrete Analysis is an arXiv overlay journal, meaning the journal's content is hosted on the arXiv.

History

Discrete Analysis was created by Timothy Gowers to demonstrate that a high-quality mathematics journal could be inexpensively produced outside of the traditional academic publishing industry. The journal is open access, and submissions are free for authors.

The journal's 2018 MCQ is 1.21.

References

External links

Open access journals
Mathematics journals
Publications established in 2016
Continuous journals
Online-only journals
English-language journals